Cara Pils is a brand of beer, as well as a type of caramel malt, used in beer making.

The brewery that brews Cara Pils changes according to which brewery can make it the cheapest. Formerly brewed by Alken-Maes, it then was brewed until 2017 in France by Brasserie de Saint-Omer, in the Nord-Pas-de-Calais region, before being brewed again in Belgium.

The Belgian beer is brewed and canned for N.V. Copimex S.A., and is sold in the Colruyt discount supermarket chain, and can also be found in almost every supermarket or nightstore.

It is one of Belgium's cheapest beers, the history of the price can be found here: in 2016 a 33 cl can sells for €0.32. In 2021, the cookbook "Koken met CaraPils" (Dutch: "Cooking with CaraPils") was published by a student in collaboration with Colruyt.

Summary
 Belgian beer
 Alcohol: 4.4% ABV
 Available in 33 cl cans, 50 cl cans, and 25 cl bottles
 Exists in a non-alcoholic version (Cara Pils NA)

External links
 Cara Pils on BeerPal.com

References

Belgian beer brands
Belgian brands